There are 75 species of echinoderm (phylum Echinodermata) recorded in Ireland.

Class Asteroidea (sea stars)

Order Forcipulatida

Family Asteriidae

Asterias rubens (common sea star)
Leptasterias muelleri (northern sea star)
Marthasterias glacialis (spiny sea star)
Stichastrella rosea

Order Paxillosida

Family Astropectinidae

Astropecten irregularis (sand sea star)

Family Luidiidae

Luidia ciliaris (seven-armed sea star)
Luidia sarsi

Order Spinulosida

Family Echinasteridae

Henricia oculata (bloody Henry starfish)
Henricia sanguinolenta (northern henricia, bloody henry)

Order Valvatida

Family Asterinidae 

Anseropoda placenta
Asterina gibbosa  (starlet cushion star)
Asterina phylactica

Family Poraniidae

Porania pulvillus

Order Velatida

Family Solasteridae 

Crossaster papposus (common sunstar)
Solaster endeca (purple sunstar, northern sunstar, smooth sun star)

Class Crinoidea (sea lilies, feather stars)

Order Comatulida (feather stars)

Family Antedonidae

Antedon bifida (rosy feather star)
Antedon petasus
Leptometra celtica

Class Echinoidea (sea urchins)

Order Camarodonta

Family Parechinidae 

Paracentrotus lividus (purple sea urchin)
Psammechinus miliaris (green sea urchin / shore sea urchin)

Order Clypeasteroida (sand dollars)

Family Echinocyamidae 

Echinocyamus pusillus (pea urchin)

Order Echinoida

Family Echinidae

Echinus esculentus (European edible sea urchin)

Order Spatangoida (heart urchins)

Family Loveniidae 

Echinocardium cordatum (sea potato)
Echinocardium flavescens   (yellow sea potato)
Echinocardium pennatifidum

Class Holothuroidea (sea cucumbers)

Order Apodida

Family Synaptidae

Labidoplax digitata
Leptosynapta bergensis
Leptosynapta inhaerens

Order Holothuriida

Family Holothuriidae

Holothuria forskali (black sea cucumber / cotton-spinner)

Order Dendrochirotida

Family Cucumariidae

Aslia lefevrei
Cucumaria frondosa (orange-footed sea cucumber)
Leptopentacta elongata
Ocnus lacteus 
Ocnus planci
Paracucumaria hyndmani (Hyndman's sea apple)
Pawsonia saxicola (sea gherkin)
Thyonidium drummondii

Family Phyllophoridae

Neopentadactyla mixta
Thyone fusus
Thyone roscovita

Class Ophiuroidea (brittle stars)

Order Ophiurida

Family Amphiuridae (long-armed burrowing brittle stars)

Amphipholis squamata (brooding snake star, dwarf brittle star)
Amphiura brachiata 
Amphiura chiajei
Amphiura filiformis
Amphiura securigera

Family Ophiactidae 

Ophiactis balli
Ophiopholis aculeata (crevice brittle star, daisy brittle star)

Family Ophiocomidae

Ophiocomina nigra (black brittle star / black serpent star)
Ophiopsila annulosa

Family Ophiothricidae

Ophiothrix fragilis (common brittle star)

Family Ophiuridae

Ophiocten affinis
Ophiura albida (serpent’s table brittle star)
Ophiura ophiura (serpent star)

References

Koehler R.,1921 Echinodermes. Faune de France  n°1  240 p., 153 fig.PDF(11 Mo) Identification

External links
Marine species identification portal
Ask About Ireland: Sea Stars
Sea Urchins on naturesweb.ie

Ireland
Ireland